Mapsidius iridescens is a moth of the family Scythrididae. It was first described by Lord Walsingham in 1907. It is endemic to the Hawaiian island of Kauai, and is notable for the somewhat iridescent coloration of its forewings.

In its larval stage, the species feeds on the leaves of Charpentiera species.

References

External links

Scythrididae
Endemic moths of Hawaii